45 is a 2009 short film produced and directed by Peter Coster and starring JC Mac. The 12-minute comedy / drama / psychological thriller is Coster's debut film as director. A Dragons Lair films and MaChico bros production.

Plot
Jaden Cole (JC Mac) relives an important day in his life over and over, each rewound day sees new information. Jaden's girlfriend Jessica (Laurette Lewis) comforts him, reassuring him that he is only worrying about the important boxing fight he has later that day. As he is caught in a twilight zone of conflicting realities unravels a shocking conclusion as he prepares for a big fight that may already be lost by default.

Cast
 Chico Slimani ... Banks 
 Terry Bird ... Jaden's trainer Terry 
 Lauretta Lewis ... Jaden's girlfriend Jessica 
 Brendan Carr ... Jason 
 Peter Coster ... Brian 
 Adrian Doughty ... Compere 
 Tony Fordham ... Boxing Referee 
 Tom Gerald ... Bank's trainer 
 Victoria Hopkins ... Ring card girl 
 Paul Jaques ... Simon 
 JC Mac ... Jaden Cole

Festivals
 Swansea Bay Film Festival (British premiere)
 Galway International Film Festival (Ireland premiere)
 Palm Springs Film Festival (American premiere)
 British Film Festival in Los Angeles
 Thailand International Film Festival

Awards
 Best UK short film (under 20 min) at the Swansea Bay Film Festival
 Best UK short film (under 20 min) at the India Intentional Film Festival

References

External links 
 

British drama short films
2009 short films
2009 directorial debut films
2000s English-language films
2000s British films